A hexagon is a polygon with 6 sides.  By extension, it can also mean:

Business 
Hexagon AB is a global industrial technology group divided into Geospatial Measuring (Surveying and GPS), Industrial Metrology and Technologies.

Computing 
Qualcomm Hexagon, a digital signal processor (DSP) developed by Qualcomm
Hexagon (software) is a 3D modeling application owned by DAZ Productions
Hexagonal Architecture in software development is an advanced architecture to structure a software application

Fiction 
The Hexagon is the name of the national military headquarters in Batman (TV series); compare with The Pentagon
Hexagon Comics, a French comic-book publisher whose characters include a group of super-heroes also called Hexagon

Music 
Hexagone is a song by Renaud, where he discusses the disgust he feels for France
Hexagonal (album) - Leessang album
Hexagon (record label) is an electronic music record label and weekly radio show hosted by Don Diablo
The band Boards of Canada commonly references the Hexagon, often using the shape as a logo of sorts (also see Hexagon Sun)
 Hexagon (album)

Science 
The hexagonal crystal system for crystallographic or mineralogic uses
KH-9 Hexagon was a USAF reconnaissance satellite
Saturn's hexagon, a consistent hexagonal cloud pattern at the north pole of Saturn.

Sports 
Exagon Engineering  a French auto racing team
"Hexagonal (CONCACAF)", a World Cup qualification stage

Theater 
The Hexagon  a theatre in Reading, England
Hexagon Theatre (KwaZulu-Natal), a theatre in Pietermaritzburg, South Africa
Hexagon (comedy show), a theater company in Washington DC, for charity

Other 
The Hexagon (l'Hexagone), epithet of Metropolitan France, owing to the shape of its European mainland
 Hexagone Balard, the headquarters of the French Armed Forces, the French counterpart to "The Pentagon" in Washington, DC.
Hexagon, a video game, later becoming Super Hexagon.

See also
Hexxagōn, a classic game
Quiz! Hexagon II, a Japanese quiz variety show on Fuji Television
Hexagon Pool